Outland is the tenth solo studio album by English musician Gary Numan, released in March 1991. It was Numan's second and last studio album to be released by I.R.S. Records.  It reached Number 39 on the UK charts. The songs "Heart" and "My World Storm" were released as singles; "Heart" charted at Number 43, while "My World Storm" eventually became a US-only promo single after a planned UK release was shelved due to the inner turmoil at the label around the release of the album. The latter however reached Number 46 on the US dance chart. The reaction to it was mixed with Q Magazine calling it 'repetitive and full of affection'.

Overview
Musically, Outland maintained previous albums' synth-pop/dance-funk style, which would continue until the artist's 1994 industrial album Sacrifice. The electro-jazz stylings of Outland are reminiscent of Numan's 1989 collaboration album with Bill Sharpe, Automatic, although its dystopian lyrics are more typical of Numan's solo work. Outland could almost be described as a concept album, as its songs share common themes and (in the case of the tracks "Confession" and "From Russia Infected") common musical and lyrical motifs. Indeed, Outland features more overt references to science-fiction than any other album Numan has released. The album features many vocal samples from notable sci-fi/action movies of the 1980s, including Blade Runner, The Terminator, Aliens and Predator (the title of Outland itself may be a reference to the 1981 science fiction film of the same name). The instrumental interludes on Outland add to the album's cinematic atmosphere. Of the album, Numan recalled:

Track listing
All songs written by Gary Numan.

All timings are approximate and will vary slightly with different equipment.

1991 IRS CD release (EIRSACD 1039)
"(Interval 1)" – 1:13
"Soul Protection" – 3:36
"Confession" – 4:17
"My World Storm" – 3:43
"Dream Killer" – 4:22
"Dark Sunday" – 4:02
"Outland" – 4:05
"Heart" – 4:06
"(Interval 2)" – 0:19
"From Russia Infected" – 4:30
"(Interval 3)" – 0:39
"Devotion" – 4:13
"Whisper" – 4:20

1999 EMI reissue (7243 5 21405 2 7)
"(Interval 1)" – 1:13
"Soul Protection" – 3:36
"Confession" – 4:17
"My World Storm" – 3:43
"Dream Killer" – 4:22
"Dark Sunday" – 4:02
"Outland" – 4:05
"Heart" – 4:06
"(Interval 2)" – 0:19
"From Russia Infected" – 4:30
"(Interval 3)" – 0:39
"Devotion" – 4:13
"Whisper" – 4:20
"Shame" – 4:48
"Icehouse" – 3:19
"Tread Careful" – 4:14
"My World Storm" (US Promo Mix) – 5:45
"My World Storm" (Alternative Mix) – 3:41

Notes
"My World Storm (US Promo Mix)" features a snippet from "Cars".
"Shame" was planned as the first single in early 1990, but with the length of time taken for the final release of the album, the single was demoted to the b-side of the eventual first single, "Heart".

Personnel
Gary Numan – vocals, keyboards, bass, drum programming, percussion programming, acoustic guitar (track 5)
Keith Beauvais – guitar
Mike Smith – drums, keyboards, acoustic guitar (track 13), slide guitar (track 7), guitar (track 8), bass (track 8), bongos (track 8)
Dick Morrissey – saxophone (track 5)
Tim Whitehead – saxophone (tracks 6 and 8)
Russell Bell – guitar (track 7)
Nick Beggs – bass (track 8)
Paul Harvey – rhythm guitar (track 12), slide guitar (track 12)
 Cathi Ogden – backing vocals

References

[ AllMusic]
Discogs.com

Gary Numan albums
1991 albums
I.R.S. Records albums